Jenna Schillaci (born 21 March 1984) is an English former professional footballer. Primarily a defender, she played for and captained Tottenham Hotspur during their rise from the lower divisions to the FA Women's Super League.

Club career

Schillaci is from the London Borough of Enfield in north London, England. She grew up in a family of Tottenham Hotspur F.C. supporters and played football with her brothers during her childhood. As a 16-year-old she joined Tottenham Hotspur Ladies and immediately went into the first team, playing in the Greater London Women's Football League and FA Women's Cup.

After one season, Schillaci left Tottenham Hotspur. She moved to play for Queens Park Rangers and later Langford, then Enfield Town. She returned to Tottenham in summer 2009.

As a versatile utility player, Schillaci featured in midfield or at full back for Spurs. After several seasons she successfully deputised as a central defender and remained permanently in the role after that. She was particularly proud to captain Spurs to the 2016–17 FA Women's Premier League Southern Division title, secured by beating West Ham at her beloved White Hart Lane.

In 2019 Schillaci was among 11 of Spurs' existing players to be offered a full-time professional contract to remain with the club following their promotion to the FA Women's Super League. Reflecting on the progress made since her humble beginnings at the club, she described the development as: "amazing, a dream come true".

Schillaci made her top division debut in Spurs' 1–0 defeat by Chelsea, played before 24,564 spectators at Stamford Bridge. After the match she told reporters: "We're not in this league to make up the numbers". The 2019–20 FA WSL season was curtailed due to the coronavirus pandemic, and 36-year-old Schillaci announced her playing retirement in June 2020.

References

External links

1984 births
Women's association football defenders
Tottenham Hotspur F.C. Women players
Women's Super League players
English women's footballers
FA Women's National League players
Footballers from the London Borough of Enfield
Living people
English people of Italian descent